Linus Lundqvist (born 26 March 1999) is a Swedish racing driver. He last competed in Indy Lights driving for HMD Motorsports with Dale Coyne Racing, having won the 2022 championship. He also won the 2020 Formula Regional Americas Champion.

Career

Karting 
Born in Tyresö, Lundqvist began karting at the age of six during a holiday in Finland and from there contested numerous championships in his native Sweden and across Europe and won numerous titles.

Lower formulae 
In 2015, Lundqvist made his single-seater debut in the Formula Renault 1.6 Nordic championship with Team TIDÖ, where he claimed fourth in the Nordic championship, second in the JSM standings and third in the NEZ championship. The following year, Lundqvist returned to the renamed Formula STCC Nordic championship with the LL Motorsport Junior Team, where he dominated proceedings to claim ten wins and finish as Drivers and NEZ champion.

In 2017, Lundqvist moved across to the British F4 championship with Double R Racing. In the championship, he claimed five victories but a string of inconsistent performances meant he could only achieve fifth in the drivers' standings.

BRDC F3 Championship 
In July 2017, Lundqvist made his debut in the BRDC British Formula 3 championship, again with Double R. There he achieved three points finishes, the highest being a seventh in the third race.

In February 2018, Double R announced Lundqvist would contest the championship full-time. There he claimed seven wins and three pole positions to claim the title at Silverstone after a season-long battle with Nicolai Kjærgaard.

GP3 Series 
In November 2018, Campos Racing confirmed they would run Lundqvist in the post-season test at Yas Marina.

Euroformula Open Championship 
After partaking in the winter series and pre-season testing with Campos Racing, Lundqvist once again teamed up with Double R to partake in the Euroformula Open Championship.

Formula Regional Americas 
In April 2020, Global Racing Group announced Lundqvist would race with them in the 2020 championship. In a dominant display, Lundqvist claimed sixteen of the eighteen race wins on offer and took the championship title at the penultimate round at Homestead.

Indy Lights 
As part of winning the Formula Regional Americas title, Lundqvist received a Honda-backed scholarship to contest the 2021 championship. In January 2021, Lundqvist announced he would join the grid with GRG with HMD Motorsports. He scored three wins and 11 podiums in 20 races, finishing third in points.

The Swede entered the 2022 Indy Lights season driving for HMD with Dale Coyne Racing. He earned five wins and nine podiums in 14 races to claim the title with a 92-point margin.

IMSA SportsCar Championship
In November 2018, Lundqvist won the Sunoco Whelen Challenge and received a drive for the 24 Hours of Daytona for 2019 with Precision Performance Motorsports. On January 5, 2022, Alegra Motorsports announced that Lundqvist would compete alongside Maximilian Götz, Daniel Morad and Michael de Quesada in the #28 Mercedes for the 2022 24 Hours of Daytona.

Racing record

Career summary

* Season still in progress.

Complete Euroformula Open Championship results 
(key) (Races in bold indicate pole position) (Races in italics indicate fastest lap)

American open–wheel racing results

Formula Regional Americas Championship 
(key) (Races in bold indicate pole position) (Races in italics indicate fastest lap)

Indy Lights
(key) (Races in bold indicate pole position) (Races in italics indicate fastest lap) (Races with L indicate a race lap led) (Races with * indicate most race laps led)

Complete IMSA SportsCar Championship results
(key) (Races in bold indicate pole position; results in italics indicate fastest lap)

References

External links

1999 births
Living people
People from Tyresö Municipality
Swedish racing drivers
British F4 Championship drivers
BRDC British Formula 3 Championship drivers
24 Hours of Daytona drivers
Indy Lights drivers
Indy Lights champions
Sportspeople from Stockholm County
MRF Challenge Formula 2000 Championship drivers
Euroformula Open Championship drivers
WeatherTech SportsCar Championship drivers
Formula Regional Americas Championship drivers
Double R Racing drivers
Dale Coyne Racing drivers
Campos Racing drivers
Karting World Championship drivers
HMD Motorsports drivers